This is the list of viziers of the Ghaznavid dynasty. All of them were ethnically Iranian.

List of viziers

References

Sources 

 
 
 
 
 
 
 
 
 
 
 
 
 
 
 
 
 

Government of the Ghaznavid Empire
Lists of office-holders